Caroline Wilson may refer to:

 Caroline Wilson (diplomat) (born 1970), British diplomat and lawyer
 Caroline Wilson (journalist) (born 1960), Australian sports journalist
 Caroline Wilson (Coronation Street), fictional character
 Caroline Fry (1787–1846), also known as Mrs Caroline Wilson, British writer